Micromonospora nickelidurans is a bacterium from the genus Micromonospora which has been isolated from soil from a nickel mine in Yueyang, China.

References

 

Micromonosporaceae
Bacteria described in 2015